Two Bloor West, is an office building at the intersection of Yonge Street and Bloor Street in Toronto, Ontario, Canada. It is sometimes referred to as Toronto's CIBC building, but that name can also refer to Commerce Court.

Located at the intersection of Yonge and Bloor along the Mink Mile, 2 Bloor Street West is a 34 storey "A" class office tower in the heart of mid-town Toronto. It has  of space and is managed by Triovest Realty Advisors Inc.

The building was completed in 1972 and underwent renovations in 1986.

Anchor tenants
 BBDO
 CDI (Career Development Institute)
 RAC (Ronald A. Chisholm)
 Ministry of Community & Social Services
 Canadian Imperial Bank of Commerce (CIBC)

Consulates
 Spain (12th Floor)
 Czech Republic (15th Floor)
 Chile (18th Floor)
 Denmark (21st Floor)
 Norway (21st Floor)
 Sweden (21st Floor)
 France (22nd Floor)
 Germany (25th Floor)

See also
 One Bloor - neighbouring condominium
 The One - approved construction project at intersection

References

External links
2 Bloor West
Leasing Info and Pictures

Skyscrapers in Toronto
Modernist architecture in Canada
Bank buildings in Canada
Oxford Properties
Canadian Imperial Bank of Commerce
Skyscraper office buildings in Canada
Office buildings completed in 1972